The following is a list of CMOS 4000-series digital logic integrated circuits.  In 1968, the original 4000-series was introduced by RCA.  Although more recent parts are considerably faster, the 4000 devices operate over a wide power supply range (3V to 18V recommended range for "B" series) and are well suited to unregulated battery powered applications and interfacing with sensitive analogue electronics, where the slower operation may be an EMC advantage. The earlier datasheets included the internal schematics of the gate architectures and a number of novel designs are able to 'mis-use' this additional information to provide semi-analog functions for timing skew and linear signal amplification. Due to the popularity of these parts, other manufacturers released pin-to-pin compatible logic devices and kept the 4000 sequence number as an aid to identification of compatible parts. However, other manufacturers use different prefixes and suffixes on their part numbers, and not all devices are available from all sources or in all package sizes.

Overview

Non-exhaustive list of manufacturers which make or have made these kind of ICs.

Current manufacturers of these ICs:
 Nexperia (spinoff from NXP)
 ON Semiconductor (acquired Motorola & Fairchild Semiconductor)
 Texas Instruments (acquired National Semiconductor)

Former manufacturers of these ICs:
 Hitachi
 NXP (acquired Philips Semiconductors)
 RCA (defunct; first introduced this 4000-series family in 1968)
 Renesas Electronics (acquired Intersil)
 ST Microelectronics 
 Toshiba Semiconductor
 VEB Kombinat Mikroelektronik (defunct; was active in the 1980s)
 Tesla Piešťany, s.p. (defunct; was active in the 1980s and 1990s)
 various manufacturers in the former Soviet Union (e.g. Angstrem, Mikron Group, Exiton, Splav, NZPP in Russia; Mezon in Moldavia; Integral in Byelorussia; Oktyabr in Ukraine; Billur in Azerbaijan)

Logic gates

Since there are numerous 4000-series parts, this section groups related combinational logic parts to make it easier for the reader to choose part numbers.

All parts in this section have normal inputs and push-pull outputs, unless stated differently.

One input voltage translation gates:
 40109 = Quad Buffer (dual power rails) (logic can step up or down, depending on power rail choice)
 4504 = Hex Buffer (dual power rails) (logic can step up or down, depending on power rail choice)

One input logic gates:
 4041 = Quad Buffer/Inverter (each input has 2 outputs Q and ) (outputs can drive one TTL / two 74LS / four CMOS loads)
 4050 = Hex Buffer (outputs can drive two TTL / four 74LS / eight CMOS loads) (VDD power rail pin at non-typical location)
 4049 = Hex Inverter (outputs can drive two TTL / four 74LS / eight CMOS loads) (VDD power rail pin at non-typical location)
 4069 = Hex Inverter
 40106 = Hex Inverter (schmitt trigger inputs) (pinout compatible with 4069)
 4572 = Quad Inverter, plus a 2-Input NOR gate and a 2-Input NAND gate (both can be converted into inverters)

Two to eight input logic gates:
 4093 = Quad 2-Input NAND (schmitt trigger inputs) (pinout compatible with 4011)
 40107 = Dual 2-Input NAND (136 mA open drain outputs) (DIP-8 package)
 {| class="wikitable"
|-
! Configuration !! AND !! NAND !! OR !! NOR !! XOR !! XNOR
|-
| Quad 2-Input || 4081 || 4011 || 4071 || 4001 || 4070 || 4077
|-
| Triple 3-Input || 4073 || 4023 || 4075 || 4025 || style="background: grey; text-align: center;" | n/a || style="background: grey; text-align: center;" | n/a
|-
| Dual 4-Input   || 4082 || 4012 || 4072 || 4002 || style="background: grey; text-align: center;" | n/a || style="background: grey; text-align: center;" | n/a
|-
| Single 8-Input || 4068 || 4068 || 4078 || 4078 || style="background: grey; text-align: center;" | n/a || style="background: grey; text-align: center;" | n/a
|}
The 4048 is an 8-input gate too (see below). The 4572 has a NOR gate and NAND gate (see above).

AND-OR-Invert (AOI) logic gates:
 4085 = Dual 2-wide 2-input AND-OR-Invert (AOI).
 4086 = Single expandable 4-wide 2-input AND-OR-Invert (AOI). This single expandable 2-2-2-2 AOI gate will reduce the boolean expression , where EXPAND is the output from another AOI gate.
 4048 = Single expandable 8-input 8-function with three-state output, 8 choices for gate type: 8 NOR / 8 OR / 8 NAND / 8 AND / 4-4 AND-OR-Invert / 4-4 AND-OR / 4-4 OR-AND-Invert / 4-4 OR-AND
When configured as AND-OR-INVERT (AOI) gate, it will reduce the boolean expression .
When configured as AND-OR (AO) gate, it will reduce the boolean expression ABCD + EFGH + EXPAND.
When configured as NOR gate, it will reduce the boolean expression , which is a 9-input NOR gate when EXPAND is used as a 9th input.
When configured as OR gate, it will reduce the boolean expression A + B + C + D + E + F + G + H + EXPAND, which is a 9-input OR gate when EXPAND is used as a 9th input.

Parts list 
This list consists mostly of part numbers from a 1983 RCA databook, though the leading "CD" and tailing letters (A, B, UB) have been removed for generic part number use.  The numeric portion of part numbers from some manufactures may not be identical to generic part numbers in this table.  Motorola typically appended a "1" in front, and removed the first "0" from part numbers within the range of 40100 to 40199, such as RCA CD40174B becomes Motorola MC14174B.

See also
 7400-series integrated circuits
 List of 7400-series integrated circuits
 Push–pull output, open drain output, Three-state output
 Schmitt trigger input
 Logic gate, Logic family
 Programmable logic device
 Pin compatibility

References

Further reading

External links
 HE4000B Family Specifications (IC04) - Signetics / NXP

Digital electronics
Electronic design
Electronics lists
Integrated circuits